Tex Avery was an American animator, cartoonist, voice actor, and director. He became famous for producing animated cartoons during the Golden age of American animation and produced his most significant work while employed by the Warner Bros. and Metro-Goldwyn-Mayer studios. 

He created the characters of Daffy Duck in Porky's Duck Hunt (1937),  in Egghead in Egghead Rides Again (1937), Elmer Fudd in Little Red Walking Hood (1937), Bugs Bunny in A Wild Hare (1940), Cecil Turtle in Tortoise Beats Hare (1941), Droopy in Dumb-Hounded (1943), Screwy Squirrel in Screwball Squirrel (1944), George and Junior in Henpecked Hoboes (1946), Spike/Butch the Bulldog (Tex Avery's version) in Bad Luck Blackie (1949), and Smedley Dog in I'm Cold (1954). He developed the characters of Porky Pig from the Warner Bros. studio and Chilly Willy from the Walter Lantz Studio into the personas for which they are best remembered.

Avery first began his animation career at the Walter Lantz studio in the early 1930s, working on the majority of the Oswald the Lucky Rabbit cartoons from 1931-35. He is listed as "animator" on the original title card credits on the Oswald cartoons. He later claimed to have directed two cartoons during this time. By 1942, Avery was in the employ of Metro-Goldwyn-Mayer, working in their cartoon division under the supervision of Fred Quimby. At MGM, Avery's creativity reached its peak. A burnt-out Avery left MGM in 1953 to return to the Walter Lantz studio. Avery's return to the Lantz studio did not last long. He directed four cartoons in 1954-1955: the one-shots Crazy Mixed-Up Pup and Shh-h-h-h-h, and I'm Cold and The Legend of Rockabye Point, in which he defined the character of Chilly Willy the penguin.

Films directed or co-directed by Tex Avery

1935: Carl Laemmle/Walter Lantz era

1935–1942: Warner Bros. era

1941: Paramount era
All shorts are in live action and in black and white.

1942–1957: MGM era

1954–1955: Universal & Walter Lantz era

1979: Hanna-Barbera era

References

Director filmographies
 
American filmographies